Khalilur Rahman Chowdhury is an Indian politician. He was elected to the Assam Legislative Assembly the lower house of Indian state from Jamunamukh Vidhan Sabha constituency in Assam in 1996 and 2006. He was a member of the Asom Gana Parishad. Later he joined Indian National Congress.

References

Living people
Indian National Congress politicians from Assam
Asom Gana Parishad politicians
Assam MLAs 1996–2001
Assam MLAs 2006–2011
Year of birth missing (living people)